Akaroa is a small town on Banks Peninsula in the Canterbury Region of the South Island of New Zealand, situated within a harbour of the same name. The name Akaroa is Kāi Tahu Māori for "Long Harbour", which would be spelled  in standard Māori. The area was also named Port Louis-Philippe by French settlers after the reigning French king Louis Philippe I.

It is set on a sheltered harbour and is overlooked and surrounded by the remnants of an eruptive centre of the miocene Banks Peninsula Volcano. Akaroa is entirely dependent upon rainfall on the hills.

Akaroa is a popular resort town. Many Hector's dolphins may be found within the harbour, and 'swim with the dolphins' boat tours are a major tourist attraction.

It includes the Karaweko  (meeting house).

History

In 1830, the Māori settlement at Takapūneke, just east of the current town of Akaroa, became the scene of a notorious incident. The captain of the British brig Elizabeth, John Stewart, helped North Island Ngāti Toa chief, Te Rauparaha, to capture the local Kāi Tahu chief, Tama-i-hara-nui, his wife Te Whe and his young daughter, Roimata. The settlement of Takapūneke was sacked. Concern over the complicity of John Stewart, amongst other lawlessness among Europeans in New Zealand, led to the appointment of an official British Resident James Busby to New Zealand in 1832 – the first step in the British involvement that led to the Treaty of Waitangi.

In early 1832, Te Rauparaha, fresh from his successful three-month siege of Kaiapoi Pā, took the pā on the Ōnawe Peninsula at the head of Akaroa Harbour. There were an estimated 400 Kāi Tahu in the pā and most were killed, with only the strongest taken as slaves.

The earliest European settlers used Akaroa as a whaling base. Akaroa is now one of the few whaling bases in New Zealand that still exists as a town.

French settlement

In 1838 Captain Jean François Langlois made a provisional purchase of land in "the greater Banks Peninsula" from 12 Kāi Tahu chiefs. A deposit of commodities in the value of £6 was paid and a further £234 worth of commodities was to be paid at a later period.

On his return to France, Langlois advertised for settlers to go to New Zealand, and ceded his interest in the land to the Nanto-Bordelaise Company, of which he became a part-owner. On 9 March 1840, 63 emigrants left from Rochefort. The settlers embarked for New Zealand on the Comte de Paris, an old man-of-war ship given to them by the French government. The Comte de Paris and its companion ship the Aube, captained by Commodore , arrived in the Bay of Islands in the North Island on 11 July 1840, where they discovered that during their voyage the British had claimed Banks Peninsula. The French arrived in Akaroa Harbour on 18 August and established a settlement centred on the present-day site of Akaroa. Bishop Pompallier established his first European station in Akaroa in 1840 as the French immigrants were all nominally Catholic. However, he closed the station in disgust, due to the religious apathy of the French immigrants.

Given that the French colonists had set out for New Zealand on the assumption that they owned the land, the New Zealand authorities made a grant of 30,000 acres to the Nanto-Bordelaise Company, which ceded all rights to the peninsula for £4,500.

Before 1840, the area of the current Akaroa town was also known as Wangaloa. The French at first called their settlement Port Louis-Philippe in honour  of Louis Philippe I, who reigned as King of the French from 1830 to 1848.

The area still shows a French influence, prominent in many local place names. It is the oldest town in Canterbury and one of the most historic places in New Zealand.

British settlement
After being informed of the French intention to colonise Akaroa and to further its use as a whaling port, the Lieutenant-Governor of New Zealand, Captain William Hobson, sent the ship  to proclaim sovereignty over the area for the British Crown. HMS Britomart arrived in Akaroa on 16 August 1840, although the captain's log shows the arrival date as 11 August. Captain Stanley raised the British flag, and held a court at each of the occupied settlements, to convince the French that the area was indeed under British control. A monument at the eastern edge of the town commemorates the British arrival.

James Robinson Clough, also known as Jimmy Robinson, had arrived at Akaroa several years before. He acted as interpreter for Captain Owen Stanley at the flag-raising of 1840, and was the first European to travel up the Avon River in 1843. Clough's descendants are still prominent on the Peninsula today.

British immigrants settled in both Akaroa and German Bay (Takamatua), along with many German farmers, who set up dairy, sheep and cocksfoot (Dactylis glomerata) farms. The great majority of the artifacts currently held at Akaroa Museum are of the early farming community and their way of life at the time.

Demographics 

Akaroa had a population of 756 at the 2018 New Zealand census, an increase of 111 people (17.2%) since the 2013 census, and an increase of 165 people (27.9%) since the 2006 census. There were 288 households. There were 375 males and 378 females, giving a sex ratio of 0.99 males per female. The median age was 55.3 years (compared with 37.4 years nationally), with 63 people (8.3%) aged under 15 years, 108 (14.3%) aged 15 to 29, 339 (44.8%) aged 30 to 64, and 240 (31.7%) aged 65 or older.

Ethnicities were 82.5% European/Pākehā, 6.0% Māori, 0.8% Pacific peoples, 11.9% Asian, and 2.8% other ethnicities (totals add to more than 100% since people could identify with multiple ethnicities).

The proportion of people born overseas was 34.9%, compared with 27.1% nationally.

Although some people objected to giving their religion, 44.4% had no religion, 34.9% were Christian, 1.6% were Hindu, 4.8% were Muslim, 1.6% were Buddhist and 4.4% had other religions.

Of those at least 15 years old, 126 (18.2%) people had a bachelor or higher degree, and 87 (12.6%) people had no formal qualifications. The median income was $31,800, compared with $31,800 nationally. The employment status of those at least 15 was that 327 (47.2%) people were employed full-time, 111 (16.0%) were part-time, and 9 (1.3%) were unemployed.

Education
Akaroa's first primary school opened in 1857, and the first high school followed in 1883. The high school was for boys only in the first year but became co-educational in the second year. However, in 1900 it closed due to a lack of paying students. The next year, it re-opened as a free District High School. It moved to the current site in 1935. In 2007, the primary school was merged with it to form Akaroa Area School.

Notable residents

 Jessie Buckland (1878–1939), photographer
 John Buckland (1844–1909), politician
 Bob Parker (born 1953), former mayor of Banks Peninsula and former resident
 William Penlington (1832–1899), sawmiller, builder and mayor of Akaroa
 William Penlington (1890–1982), school principal and educationalist
 Hugh Wilson (born 1945), botanist living at Hinewai Reserve over the hill from Akaroa
 Frank Worsley (1872–1943), sailor and explorer who served on Ernest Shackleton's Imperial Trans-Antarctic Expedition of 1914–1916, as captain of the Endurance

Notes

References

External links

 Akaroa official website
 Akaroa Civic Trust

 
Banks Peninsula
Populated places in Canterbury, New Zealand
Populated places established in 1840
Miocene volcanoes
Volcanoes of New Zealand
Landforms of Canterbury, New Zealand
English-New Zealand culture
French-New Zealand culture
Louis Philippe I